The flag of the Qing dynasty was an emblem adopted in the late 19th century featuring the Azure Dragon on a plain yellow field with the red flaming pearl in the upper left corner. It became the first national flag of China and is usually referred to as the "Yellow Dragon Flag".

Ruling China from 1644 until the overthrow of the monarchy during the Xinhai Revolution, the Qing dynasty was the last imperial dynasty in China's history. Between 1862 and 1912, the dynasty represented itself with the dragon flag.

Designs 
Throughout the history of China's imperial dynasties, yellow was considered the royal color of successive Chinese emperors. The legendary first emperor of China was known as the Yellow Emperor. Members of the imperial family of China at that time were the only ones allowed to display the color yellow in buildings and on garments. The Emperor of China  usually used a Chinese dragon as a symbol of the imperial power and strength. Generally, a five-clawed dragon was used by emperors only. 

In Chinese culture, a flaming pearl is shown on top of the dragon's head. The pearl is associated with wealth, good luck, and prosperity.

The design of the flag was largely based on the Plain Yellow Banner, the one of three "upper" banner armies among the Eight Banners under the direct command of the emperor himself, and one of the four "right wing" banners.

The Eight Banners
The Eight Banners were administrative/military divisions under the Qing dynasty into which all Manchu households were placed. In war, the Eight Banners functioned as armies, but the banner system was also the basic organizational framework of all of Manchu society.

Triangular version (1862–1889) 

The Arrow Incident of 1856 occurred as a result of Chinese civilian vessels flying foreign flags as the Qing dynasty had no official flag at the time. In 1862, sailors from the Chinese and British navies clashed at Wuhan on the Yangtze River. In response to protests from the British government that their ships were unable to properly distinguish between Chinese navy ships and civilian vessels, Yixin (Prince Gong) urged Zeng Guofan to create a governmental flag for the Qing, and suggested use of a yellow dragon flag, which was also used as one of the Eight Banners of the Manchu as well as in the Chinese army. After due consideration, Zeng Guofan concluded that a square flag bore too close a resemblance to the Plain Yellow Banner of the Eight Banners with the potential to be viewed as an endorsement of the Eight Banners hierarchy, he instead removed one corner to create a triangular flag.

The triangular version of the yellow dragon flag was restricted to naval and governmental use only, no civilian ships were permitted  to fly the yellow pennant, and it never formally became the national flag. However, on some diplomatic occasions and at international exhibitions, this flag was used to represent China.

Rectangular version (1889–1912) 

In September 1881, when the two cruisers Chaoyong and Yangwei ordered from Birkenhead, England were sent to China, Li Hongzhang realized a triangular ensign was unique among naval flags of other countries. As a result, he petitioned the imperial court for permission and subsequently altered the triangular naval flag into a rectangular one.

Seeing Western countries flying national flags on official occasions, Li Hongzhang also asked Empress Dowager Cixi to select a national flag for the Qing dynasty. Among the proposals for use of the Ba gua flag, the Yellow dragon flag and the Qilin flag, Cixi selected the Yellow dragon design. In 1888, the imperial court promulgated the naval flag as the Qing national flag.

Influence 

The notion of yellow as representative of Manchu ethnicity was used in the flags of the Five Races Under One Union flag of the Republic of China, and on the flag of the Empire of China, respectively, although in 1912 the former was challenged by Sun Yat-sen, who thought it inappropriate to use the traditional imperial color to represent Manchu ethnicity. Also, mustard yellow was used in the flag of Manchukuo in deference to the Qing dynasty, on whose flag it was based.

The blue dragon was featured in the Twelve Symbols national emblem, which was the state emblem of China from 1913 to 1928.

Naval flags of Qing dynasty
Horatio Nelson Lay's Proposal (1862)

When the Qing dynasty purchased warships from the United Kingdom in 1862, Horatio Nelson Lay designed several naval flags based on the custom flag he designed. These proposals were not recognized by the Qing dynasty government.

Beiyang Fleet (1874–1890)

The Beiyang Fleet was created in 1874, and several rank flags were introduced based on the traditional five color officials' flags of the old Chinese navy.

Beiyang Navy (1890–1909)

The Beiyang Fleet became the national navy by Regulations of the Beiyang Fleet in 1888. However, rank flags were not updated until 1890, when William Metcalfe Lang and Liu Buchan disputed about their rank flags in an incident. Therefore, the British Royal Navy advisers proposed five new rank flags to replace the simple two rank flags system.

However these proposals were not adopted by the Qing dynasty. New rank flags were introduced later in 1890.

Imperial Navy (1909–1911)

After the total defeat of the Beiyang Navy in First Sino-Japanese War in 1894, the new imperial navy was reorganized following the establishment of the department of the navy in 1909. The Imperial Chinese Navy adopted the national flag in the canton of naval flags in 1909.

Flags based on the Qing dynasty flag
Chinese Eastern Railway
Flag of Chinese Eastern Railway adopted a combination of Qing dynasty and Russian flags. The flag was not updated until 1915.

See also 

 Flag of Bhutan
 Flags of China

References

External links 

Qing Dynasty
Qing dynasty culture
Obsolete national flags
1862 introductions
Eight Banners
Dragons in art
Qing Dynasty
Qing Dynasty
Flags displaying animals